Tapinoma atriceps is a species of ant in the genus Tapinoma. Described by Emery in 1888, the species is endemic to Brazil and Paraguay.

References

Tapinoma
Hymenoptera of South America
Insects described in 1888